Jeremy Michael Jordan (born November 20, 1984) is an American actor and singer. He has performed on Broadway, in television and film, in concert, as well as in other theatrical productions.

He made his Broadway debut in 2009 as part of Rock of Ages. Subsequently, he went to star in the original Broadway musicals Bonnie & Clyde (2011) as Clyde Barrow and Newsies (2012) as Jack Kelly, for which he was nominated for a Tony Award and a Grammy Award. He has also appeared in the musicals West Side Story and Waitress and the play American Son on Broadway. In 2021, he starred in the Off-Broadway revival of Little Shop of Horrors. On screen, he starred opposite Anna Kendrick in the 2014 musical film The Last Five Years and as Jimmy Collins in the NBC series Smash (2013). From 2015 to 2021, he played Winslow "Winn" Schott Jr. on the CBS/CW DC Comics-based superhero drama series Supergirl.

Early life and education
Jordan was born on November 20, 1984, in Corpus Christi, Texas, where he was raised. His parents divorced when he was young, and he lived in low-income housing, with his brother, Joey, sister, Jessa, and mother, Debbie (née Stone). His stepmother died in a car crash when he was in 7th grade. Jordan was injured and started to pursue singing when he had to take a break from sports during his recovery. His father is of English, Scottish, Welsh and German descent, while his mother is Jewish (her parents' families were Jewish emigrants from Russia, Poland, Latvia, and Lithuania). He has said, "I am Jewish... [growing up] we had Jewish holidays and Christian holidays. I was the best of both worlds." He was an excellent student, graduating from Mary Carroll High School, where he was active in choir. He graduated from Ithaca College, in Ithaca, New York, with a Bachelor of Fine Arts in musical theatre.

Career

Stage
Jordan sang as a teenager and began acting in high school. In 2008, he starred as Alex in The Little Dog Laughed at Hartford Theatreworks, for which he received a Connecticut Critics Circle nomination. Later that year, he played Tom Sawyer in Big River at the Goodspeed Opera House in Connecticut. He appeared in the Broadway cast of Rock of Ages in 2009.

Jordan was an alternate for the leading role of Tony in the 2009 Broadway revival of West Side Story. He also starred as Clyde Barrow in the 2010 pre-Broadway Sarasota, Florida, tryout of the new musical Bonnie & Clyde by Frank Wildhorn and Don Black. He debuted the role of Clyde when the show opened on Broadway on December 1, 2011. The show closed on December 30, 2011, after 36 performances.

Jordan played Jack in the stage version of Newsies at the Paper Mill Playhouse in New Jersey in September and October 2011. Jordan reprised the lead role as Jack Kelly in Disney's Newsies on Broadway, with music by Alan Menken, lyrics by Jack Feldman, and book by Harvey Fierstein. Newsies opened at the Nederlander Theatre on March 29, 2012. For the role, Jordan was nominated for the 2012 Tony Award for Best Performance by a Leading Actor in a Musical. He was nominated for a 2013 Grammy Award for Best Musical Theatre Album as a principal soloist on the Newsies original cast album.

He appeared in the Stephen Sondheim and Wynton Marsalis staged concert A Bed and A Chair for Encores! at New York City Center from November 13 to 17, 2013, along with Norm Lewis and Bernadette Peters. In December 2013, Jordan appeared in Hit List, a concert presentation of the fictional musical created for the second season of Smash. He has performed at 54 Below in New York City many times as both a soloist and with his Smash costars. On February 16, 2015, Jordan starred as Leo Frank, opposite Laura Benanti as Lucille Frank, in the concert production of Parade, also written by Jason Robert Brown, at the Lincoln Center's Avery Fisher Hall. Jordan was featured as Light Yagami in the 2014/2015 English concept album of Death Note: The Musical.

In June 2016, Jordan reprised his role as Tony in the Hollywood Bowl concerts of West Side Story, alongside Karen Olivo and George Akram. Published on December 19, 2017, Jeremy Jordan was on a YouTube video as a musical director as well as Michael Gracey of a 2017 behind the scenes "The Greatest Showman" standing side by actor Hugh Jackman. (The Greatest Showman "From Now On" 20th Century FOX) In October 2018 Jordan appeared in the play American Son, on Broadway alongside Kerry Washington and Steven Pasquale, a role he and the others reprised in the play's 2019 Netflix film adaptation. In 2019 Jordan started appearing in the musical Waitress on Broadway alongside Shoshana Bean. In April 2021, he gave an interview on The Theatre Podcast with Alan Seales, discussing his 54/Below cabaret show "Carry On".

Film and television
Jordan made a 2008 television appearance, guest-starring on NBC's Law & Order: SVU in the episode "Streetwise". He starred in the Warner Bros. film Joyful Noise, opposite Queen Latifah, Keke Palmer, and Dolly Parton. The film opened on January 13, 2012. It was announced in June 2012 that Jordan would join the cast of NBC's Smash for season two playing Jimmy. He filmed episodes for Smash while performing in Newsies until his final performance in the musical on September 4.

Jordan played Jamie Wellerstein in The Last Five Years, a film adaptation of the musical of the same name, written by Jason Robert Brown, costarring Anna Kendrick as Cathy Hiatt. The film was shot over three weeks in June 2013, and released in February 2015. In 2015, Jordan was cast as Winslow "Winn" Schott Jr. on Supergirl. The premiere on CBS was watched by 12.96 million viewers and received a full season order on November 30, 2015. Jordan received praise for his performance on the show, which would move to The CW after the first season. He stayed on as series regular for two subsequent seasons. From 2017-2020, he voiced Varian in Disney's Rapunzel's Tangled Adventure.

On June 20, 2019, it was reported that Jordan would be starring as Casablanca Records founder Neil Bogart in the upcoming biopic Spinning Gold.

On July 15, 2020, it was announced that Jordan would star in the upcoming Hallmark Channel film Holly and Ivy, alongside Janel Parrish and Marisol Nichols. The film was released on November 1, 2020 on Hallmark Movies & Mysteries. On January 3, 2021, it was announced that Jordan would star in another Hallmark Channel film Mix Up in the Mediterranean, alongside Jessica Lowndes. The film was released on February 20, 2021.]

Jordan announced via social media that he would be starting a band, Age of Madness, which released their first album in spring 2022.

Personal life
Jordan married Broadway actress and singer Ashley Spencer on September 8, 2012. They have a daughter, Clara Eloise Jordan, born April 21, 2019.

Filmography

Film

Television

Stage credits
Source:

Awards and nominations

References

External links
  (archive)
 
 

1984 births
Living people
21st-century American male actors
American male dancers
American male film actors
American male musical theatre actors
American male stage actors
American male television actors
American male voice actors
Ithaca College alumni
American people of English descent
American people of German descent
American people of Latvian-Jewish descent
American people of Lithuanian-Jewish descent
American people of Polish-Jewish descent
American people of Russian-Jewish descent
American people of Scottish descent
American people of Welsh descent
Jewish American male actors
People from Corpus Christi, Texas
Male actors from Texas
Singers from Texas
21st-century American singers
Theatre World Award winners
21st-century American male singers
21st-century American Jews